GenomeWeb LLC is an online news organization based in New York City, New York. Established in 1997, it aims to report scientific and business news related to genomics.

History
GenomeWeb LLC was founded in 1997 by publishing entrepreneur Dennis Waters. It initially published only two newsletters: BioInform and
Agricultural Genomics. Soon afterward, the company launched several more newsletters, as well as a magazine and a set of blogs on their website. By 2011, the company published eight newsletters, a news website, and the print magazine Genome Technology. In September 2019, it was acquired by Crain Communications.

References

External links

Biology websites
Internet properties established in 1997
Companies based in New York City
1997 establishments in New York City
American news websites
Science journalists